Bank Woori Saudara (formerly known as Bank Saudara) is an Indonesia-based financial institution. Bank Saudara was founded in 1906 by ten merchants of Pasar Baru in Bandung, West Java. The Bank's products and services include savings and checking accounts, fixed deposits, credit loans and other banking services.

On 14 March 2012, Bank Saudara announced a plan to merge with Bank Woori Indonesia, Indonesian subsidiary of Woori Bank of South Korea.
PT Bank Himpunan Saudara 1906, Tbk (Bank Saudara) has obtained approval from Bank Indonesia (BI) via an approval letter on December 30, 2013 related to the purchase of 27% (twenty-seven percent) Bank Saudara’s shares by the Woori Bank of Korea and the remaining 6% (six percent) has been approved in advance on April 16, 2013. Earlier this year, Woori achieved one of its long-awaited overseas operation goals ― Indonesia’s central bank approved Woori’s acquisition of a 33-percent stake in Bank Saudara.

Board of directors

Commissioner

Director

References

External links
 
 Corporate Info

Banks of Indonesia
Microfinance organizations
Companies based in Bandung
Banks established in 1906
Indonesian brands
1906 establishments in the Dutch East Indies
2006 initial public offerings
Companies listed on the Indonesia Stock Exchange